The 1982 Argentine motorcycle Grand Prix was the first round of the 1982 Grand Prix motorcycle racing season. It took place on the weekend of 27–29 March 1982 at the Autódromo Municipal de la Ciudad de Buenos Aires.

Classification

500 cc

References

Argentine Republic motorcycle Grand Prix
Motorcycle Grand Prix
Argentine